Casmena schoutedeni is a species of leaf beetle of the Democratic Republic of the Congo, described by Maurice Pic in 1952.

References

Eumolpinae
Beetles of the Democratic Republic of the Congo
Taxa named by Maurice Pic
Beetles described in 1952
Endemic fauna of the Democratic Republic of the Congo